Henry Bannister Merwin (1873 – 22 February 1922), was an American poet, magazine editor, novelist, film director and screenwriter during the silent era. He wrote as many as 141 films between 1909 and 1921. He was associated with Edison Studios and the London Film Company. Merwin often wrote with his wife, Anne Merwin.

He was born in Lichfield, Connecticut, United States and died in London, England, United Kingdom.

Selected filmography

Screenwriter
 For the Cause of the South (1912)
 In His Father's Steps (1912)
 Holding the Fort (1912)
 Helping John (1912)
 The Sunset Gun (1912)
 Liberty Hall (1914)
 The Black Spot (1914)
 She Stoops to Conquer (1914)
 A Turf Conspiracy (1918)
 The Silver Greyhound (1919)
 The Land of Mystery (1920)
 London Pride (1920)
 The Pursuit of Pamela (1920)
 True Tilda (1920)
 The Golden Dawn (1921)
 The Magistrate (1921)

Director
 Her Heritage (1919)

References

External links
 
 

1873 births
1922 deaths
American film directors
20th-century American screenwriters